Ian Piccard (born 11 March 1968) is a French former alpine skier who competed in the 1994 Winter Olympics and 1998 Winter Olympics.

He is the brother of fellow skiers Franck Piccard, Leila Piccard, Ted Piccard and Jeff Piccard.

References

External links
 sports-reference.com

1968 births
Living people
French male alpine skiers
Olympic alpine skiers of France
Alpine skiers at the 1994 Winter Olympics
Alpine skiers at the 1998 Winter Olympics